The Bishop of Lausanne (French: Évêque de Lausanne) was a Prince-Bishop of the Holy Roman Empire (since 1011) and the Ordinary of the diocese of Lausanne, Switzerland (Latin: Dioecesis Lausannensis).

Bern secularized the bishopric in 1536. The bishop fled into exile, first in Evian, and then in Burgundy. Today, the Catholic diocese of Fribourg, Lausanne, and Geneva has its seat in Fribourg.

For the ecclesiastical history, see Lausanne and Geneva bishopric(s)

List of bishops

Bishop of Avenches

Bubulcus (517-535)
Grammatius (535-549)

Bishop of Lausanne 574-1536

Saint Marius (574-594)
Arricus 639-654
Prothasius 652
Chilmegiselus 670
Udalricus 690
Fredarius 814-825
David 827-850
Hartmannus 852-878
Hieronimus 878-892
Boso 892-927
Libo 927-932
Bero 932-947
Magnerius 947-968
Eginolfus 968-985
Henri of Bourgogne 985-1018
Hugues of Bourgogne 1018-1037
Henri II of Lenzbourg 1039-1051/56
Burchard of Oltingen 1056-1089
Lambert of Grandson 1089-1090
Cono of Fenis 1090-1103/07
Giroldus or Gérard of Faucigny 1105-1126/34
Guy of Maligny or of Marlaniaco 1134-1143
Amedeus of Clermont call of Lausanne 1145-1159
Landri of Durnes 1160-1178/79
Roger of Vico-Pisano 1178-1212
Berthold of Neuchâtel 1212-1220
Gérard of Rougemont 1220-1221
Guillaume of Ecublens 1221-1229
Boniface Clutinc 1231-1239
Jean of Cossonay 1240-1273
Guillaume de Champvent 1273-1301
Gérard of Vuippens 1302-1309
Othon of Champvent 1309-1312
Pierre of Oron 1313-1323
Jean de Rossillon 1323-1341
Jean Bertrand 1341-1342
Geoffroi de Vayrols 1342-1347
François Prévost (Proust) 1347-1354
Aymon de Cossonay 1355-1375
Guy of Prangins 1375-1394
Aymon Séchal administrator, 1394-1394
Guillaume of Menthonay 1394-1406
Guillaume of Challant 1406-1431
Louis of la Palud 1431-1433
Jean of Prangins 1433-1440
Georges of Saluces 1440-1461
Guillaume de Varax 1462-1466
Jean Michel 1466-1468
Barthélémy Chuet, administrator 1469-1472
Giuliano della Rovere, 1472-1473, future pope Julius II, 1503-1513,
Benoît of Montferrand 1476-1491
Aymon of Montfalcon 1491-1517
Sébastien of Montfalcon 1517-1536/60

Bishop of Lausanne 1600-1814
Jean de Watteville 1609-1649
Jost Knab 1652-1658
Henri Fuchs 1658-1662 (apostolic administrator)
Jean-Baptiste de Strambino 1662-1684
Pierre de Montenbach 1688-1707
Jacques Duding 1707-1716
Claude-Antoine Duding 1716-1745
Joseph-Hubert de Boccard 1746-1758
Joseph-Nicolas de Montenach 1758-1782
Berndard-Emmanuel de Lenzbourg 1782-1795
Jean-Baptiste d'Odet 1796-1803
Joseph-Antoine Guisolan 1804-1814

Bishop of Lausanne and Geneva 1821-1924 

 Pierre-Tobie Yenni (1815-1845)
 Etienne Marilley (1846-1879)
 Christophore Cosandey (1879-1882)
 Gaspard Mermillod (1883-1891)
 Joseph Déruaz (1891-1911)
 André-Maurice Bovet (1911-1915)
 Placide Colliard (1915-1920)

Bishop of Lausanne, Geneva and Fribourg from 1924 
 Marius Besson (1920-1945)
 François Charrière (1945-1970)
 Pierre Mamie (1970-1995)
 Amédée (Antoine-Marie) Grab, O.S.B. (1995-1998)
 Bernard Genoud (1999-2010)
 Charles Morerod, O.P. (2011-Present)

Notes and references 

Lausanne
Lausanne
 
Bishops of Lausanne